The administrator of Lakshadweep is the head of the Union Territory of Lakshadweep. He is also the Chairman of Lakshadweep Development Corporation (a U.T. Administration public sector undertaking) and SPORTS (Society for Promotion of Recreational Tourism and Sports). He functions ex-officio as the Inspector General of Lakshadweep Police.

Administrators

See also
 List of current Indian lieutenant governors and administrators

References

External links
 http://www.worldstatesmen.org/India_states.html

Lakshadweep

Lists of Indian civil servants
Lakshadweep